Bartlett Lake is a reservoir that was formed by the damming of the Verde River in the U.S. state of Arizona. It is downstream and to the south of Horseshoe Reservoir. Constructed in 1936–39 by the Salt River Project, the Bartlett Dam and reservoir were named for Bill Bartlett, a government surveyor. Bartlett Lake was the first reservoir built on the Verde River.

After wet winters, the Bartlett Lake area often has fine displays of spring wildflowers. The facilities at Bartlett Lake are managed by the Forest Service.

Sport fishing and other recreation

The nearest town with fuel, groceries, fishing tackle, restaurants, and other amenities is Carefree. At the lake itself, it is possible to rent boats and buy fishing licenses, fuel, groceries, and fishing equipment.

The lake and its surrounding areas offer opportunities for swimming and waterskiing, camping and picnicking. Trailer spaces and restrooms are available. Users must obtain a U.S. Forest Service Tonto Pass and perhaps pay other fees for various uses of Bartlett Lake.

See also
 Bartlett Dam (Arizona)

References

Works cited
 Arizona Fishin' Holes: The Arizona Game and Fish Department's Guide to Public Fishing Waters and Facilities in Arizona (2010). Phoenix: Arizona Game and Fish Department.

External links
 
 Daily Water Level report from SRP
 Bartlett Lake Marina
 Arizona Boating Locations
 Arizona Fishing Locations Map

1939 establishments in Arizona
Reservoirs in Maricopa County, Arizona
Tonto National Forest
Reservoirs in Arizona